San Felice Circeo is a town and comune in the province of Latina, in the Lazio region of central Italy. It was an ancient city called Circeii.

It is included in the Circeo National Park. Sites include the Grotta Guattari, one of the oldest Neanderthal sites in Italy, in which remains of nine Neanderthals were discovered.

History

In the treaty signed between Carthage and Rome in 509 BC, the Carthaginians agreed not to harm Circeii.

In 209 BC, during the Second Punic War, Circeii was one of twelve Latin colonies to refuse any more military contributions towards Rome and in 204 it was severly punished as a result, by furnishing double the greatest number of foot soldiers they had ever provided and 120 horsemen, all chosen from the wealthiest of the inhabitants, and to be sent out of Italy. Also an annual tax was imposed.

The Roman Triumvir Lepidus was exiled here after his fall in 36 BC by his former colleague, and future Emperor, Octavian.

References

External links
 SanFeliceCirceo.eu 

Cities and towns in Lazio